Plane Nuts is the fourth of five short subjects starring Ted Healy and His Stooges (Moe Howard, Larry Fine and Curly Howard) released by Metro-Goldwyn-Mayer on October 14, 1933. A musical-comedy film, the short also featured Bonnie Bonnell as Healy's love interest. The Stooges were billed as "Howard, Fine and Howard."

Cast
Ted Healy as himself
Moe Howard as Moe
Larry Fine as Larry
Curly Howard as Curly
Bonnie Bonnell as Woman with Flowers

Uncredited cast
Albertina Rasch Dancers as Themselves
Lorretta Andrews as Chorus Girl
Mildred Dixon as Chorus Girl
Mary Halsey as Chorus Girl
Nelly Loren as showgirl

Production notes
The musical numbers "Happy Landing" and "Dance Until Dawn" were lifted from the 1931 MGM feature film Flying High.

The Stooges and Healy were to appear in a segment where they fly around the world backwards, but it was cut from the final version. This footage is discussed, with production photos, in Leonard Maltin's 1990 television documentary The Lost Stooges.

See also
The Three Stooges filmography

References

External links

1933 films
Metro-Goldwyn-Mayer short films
The Three Stooges films
American black-and-white films
Films directed by Jack Cummings
American aviation films
1933 musical comedy films
American musical comedy films
1933 short films
1930s English-language films
1930s American films